Siderotil is an iron(II) sulfate hydrate mineral with formula:  FeSO4·5H2O which forms by the dehydration of melanterite. Copper commonly occurs substituting for iron in the structure. It typically occurs as fibrous or powdery encrustations, but may also occur as acicular triclinic crystals.

It was first described in 1891 for an occurrence in the Idrija Mine, Idrija, Slovenia. Its name derives from the Greek sideros (iron) and tilos (fiber) in reference to its iron content and typical fibrous form. However, the material at the Idrija location may not be siderotil, but the mineral has been authenticated from a wide variety of worldwide locations.

References

Sulfate minerals
Iron(II) minerals
Triclinic minerals
Minerals in space group 2
Chalcanthite group